David John Callaghan (born 1 February 1965) is a former South African international cricketer. Despite there being a distance of eight years between his first and last One Day International, Callaghan only played 29 times for South Africa. He was born at Queenstown, Eastern Cape.

International career
The defining moment of his international career was an innings of 169 not out, made against New Zealand at Centurion during the Mandela Trophy in 1994. Opening the batting, Callaghan made 169 off 143 balls and hit 4 sixes. This happens to be the highest score in ODIs by a batsman, who have scored only one 50-plus knock in their career. He also took his career best figures of 3 for 32 and was the obvious choice for man of the match. Callaghan's innings was his first after recovering from testicular cancer.

In February 2020, he was named in South Africa's squad for the Over-50s Cricket World Cup in South Africa. However, the tournament was cancelled during the third round of matches due to the coronavirus pandemic.

References

External links

St George's Park profile

1965 births
Living people
People from Queenstown, South Africa
South African cricketers
South African people of Irish descent
Eastern Province cricketers
Griqualand West cricketers
Nottinghamshire cricketers
Suffolk cricketers
South Africa One Day International cricketers
Marylebone Cricket Club cricketers
Alumni of Grey High School
Cricketers from the Eastern Cape